Evan Wells is an American video game designer and programmer, and co-president of Naughty Dog. Wells' first video game was at Sega, where he worked on ToeJam & Earl in Panic on Funkotron, before moving to Crystal Dynamics in 1995 to work on Gex and Gex: Enter the Gecko. He was employed at Naughty Dog in 1998, working on several Crash Bandicoot and Jak and Daxter titles before becoming co-president of the company alongside Stephen White in 2005; White was replaced the following year by Christophe Balestra, who retired in 2017. The two oversaw the release of the Uncharted series, and The Last of Us. Wells remained the sole president, overseeing the release of The Last of Us Part II, until Neil Druckmann's promotion to co-president in 2020.

Career 
Evan Wells graduated from Stanford University in 1995 with a computer science degree. He worked at Sega in 1993, working on ToeJam & Earl in Panic on Funkotron (1993) as a lead tester, before working at Crystal Dynamics from 1994 to 1998, working on Gex (1995) as a programmer, and Gex: Enter the Gecko (1998) as lead designer. Wells then moved to Naughty Dog, where he worked on Crash Bandicoot: Warped (1998), Crash Team Racing (1999), Jak and Daxter: The Precursor Legacy (2001), Jak II (2003), Jak 3 (2004) and Jak X: Combat Racing (2005). Following the departure of founders Jason Rubin and Andy Gavin in 2004, Wells became co-president of Naughty Dog alongside Stephen White; White was replaced by Christophe Balestra after a year. Wells continued to work as co-president during the release of the Uncharted titles (2007–17), as well as The Last of Us (2013). Balestra retired from the company in April 2017; Wells became the sole president. Neil Druckmann was promoted to vice president in March 2018, and to co-president alongside Wells in December 2020. Wells was an executive producer on the film Uncharted (2022), and on the television adaptation of The Last of Us with HBO.

Works

Video games

Film and television

References

External links
 

Place of birth missing (living people)
Date of birth missing (living people)
Living people
American video game designers
American video game programmers
Video game programmers
Uncharted
Stanford University alumni
Naughty Dog people
Year of birth missing (living people)